Gabriele Nebe (born 1967) is a German mathematician with contributions in the theory of lattices, modular forms, spherical designs, and error-correcting codes. With Neil Sloane, she maintains the Online Catalogue of Lattices. She is a professor in the department of mathematics at RWTH Aachen University.

Education
Nebe earned a doctorate (Dr. rer. nat.) in 1995 from RWTH Aachen University. Her dissertation, Endliche Rationale Matrixgruppen vom Grad 24 concerned the theory of finite matrix groups and was supervised by Wilhelm Plesken.

Research 
Nebe is known for using integral representations of finite groups to construct explicit examples of discrete mathematical structures using computer algebra systems. Her constructions include extremal even unimodular lattices in 48, 56, and 72 dimensions and an extremal 3-modular lattice in 64 dimensions. These lattices represent the densest known sphere packings and the highest known kissing numbers in these dimensions. Her discovery of an extremal unimodular lattice in 72 dimensions settled a long open problem.

Awards and honours 
 1995 – Friedrich Wilhelm Prize 
 2002 – Merckle Research Prize 
 2003 – Research Fellowship – Radcliffe Institute, Harvard University

References 

Living people
1967 births
20th-century German mathematicians
21st-century German mathematicians
20th-century women mathematicians
21st-century women mathematicians